Bocines (variant: San Martín de Bocines) is one of thirteen parishes (administrative divisions) in the Gozón municipality, within the province and autonomous community of Asturias, in northern Spain. 

Parishes in Gozón